Steven Andrew King (born July 22, 1969) is an American former professional ice hockey forward who played professionally from 1991 to 2000. He played 67 games in the National Hockey League for the New York Rangers and Mighty Ducks of Anaheim, as well as time in both the minor American Hockey League and International Hockey League.

Playing career
King played collegiate hockey at Brown University for 4 seasons, and during his senior year (1990–1991) he was selected by the New York Rangers in the 1991 NHL Supplemental Draft. During his first two professional seasons, King played 119 games for the Binghamton Rangers of the American Hockey League, and he was called up to the National Hockey League by New York for 24 games in the 1992–93 NHL season. The Mighty Ducks of Anaheim entered the league during 1993–94 NHL season and they claimed King from the Rangers in the 1993 NHL Expansion Draft. King played 43 more NHL games from 1993 to 1995 and then finished his career playing for the Baltimore Bandits, Philadelphia Phantoms, Rochester Americans, Providence Bruins, and Springfield Falcons of the AHL and the Michigan K-Wings and Cincinnati Cyclones of the International Hockey League.

During his career King played in 67 NHL games, scoring 17 goals along with 8 assists.  His other professional hockey statistics included 135 goals and 94 assists during 257 AHL games and 32 goals and 20 assists in 80 IHL games.  At Brown University he scored 56 goals and added 33 assists in 104 games.

Post-playing career
After he retired as a player, King returned to Brown University and served as an assistant coach during the 2000–2001 and 2001–2002 collegiate seasons. He then worked as a financial advisor for three years before returning to Brown in 2006 to succeed his former classmate, Ron Dalgliesh, as the Executive Director of the Brown University Sports Foundation.

King was inducted into the Rhode Island Hockey Hall of Fame in 2023.

Career statistics

Regular season and playoffs

References

External links

1969 births
Living people
American men's ice hockey right wingers
Baltimore Bandits players
Brown Bears men's ice hockey players
Ice hockey players from Rhode Island
Mighty Ducks of Anaheim players
National Hockey League supplemental draft picks
New York Rangers draft picks
New York Rangers players
People from East Greenwich, Rhode Island
Philadelphia Phantoms players
Providence Bruins players
Rochester Americans players
Springfield Falcons players